Peter Tenny Coffield (July 17, 1945 – November 19, 1983) was an American actor. Coffield worked as an actor in theater, television, and film. He is best known for his role in the film Cry Rape!. His other films include Times Square (1980) and Neil Simon's Only When I Laugh.

Coffield guest starred on several TV shows throughout the 1970s and early 1980s, including The Love Boat, Hart to Hart, Eight Is Enough, Wide World Mystery, Family, ‘’ Barnaby Jones’’ and Love, Sidney, and he acted in TV movies such as Washington: Behind Closed Doors, and The Man Without a Country. He also performed in several plays on Broadway, including Hamlet (1969), Abelard and Heloise (1971), The Merchant of Venice (1973), Tartuffe (1977), and The Man Who Came to Dinner (1980).

In addition to Broadway, Coffield had key roles in Misalliance at the Roundabout Theater, in A. R. Gurney's Middle Ages at the Hartman Theater in Stamford, Conn., and in S. N. Behrman's No Time for Comedy at the McCarter Theater in Princeton, N.J., and he performed at the Kennedy Center for the Performing Arts in Washington and at the Old Globe Shakespeare Festival Theater in San Diego.

In The New York Times review of Coffield's performance as a homosexual student in Abelard and Heloise, theater critic Walter Kerr wrote, "Making a mask of his broad, handsome face, Mr. Coffield went about his chores deftly, confidently, with clear and virile purpose. Saying little, he seemed to think a great deal: thought can be a scene-thief, it turns out."

Coffield was nominated for a Daytime Emmy Award in 1974 for Best Actor in Daytime Drama for his role in CBS Daytime 90: Legacy of Fear.

Personal life 

Coffield grew up in an Irish-Catholic household, the youngest of five children. Peter's eldest three siblings, Carolyn Coffield, Kitty (Katherine Amelia) Coffield, and James Coffield III, are from his father's first marriage. (Peter's father, James L. Coffield, was widowed in 1935; he married Peter's mother, Mary White, in 1939. They had two children together, Michael and Peter, and the children from both marriages lived as a single family.) Coffield's father died in 1960; his mother died in 2001 in Tasmania, Australia, at the age of 94. Peter's brother Michael, an attorney in Chicago, died in 2007.

Coffield graduated from New Trier High School in 1963 and from Northwestern University in Evanston, Illinois in 1967, where he earned a B.S. in Oral Interpretation. He also earned a master's degree from the University of Michigan.

Coffield's longtime life partner was James Tripp, also an actor, who is the Head of Acting at the Stella Adler Conservatory in New York. Relationship confirmed in James Tripp obit at StellaAdler.com.

Coffield died of an AIDS-related illness on November 19, 1983.

Filmography

References

External links 
 
 
 Peter Coffield performances on YouTube
 Peter Coffield profile on Flixster
 Memorial notice, The New York Times
 Peter Coffield Obituary, The New York Times
 Wilmette Library obituary reference
 Peter Coffield Obituary, Wilmette Life

1945 births
1983 deaths
Male actors from Illinois
American male film actors
American male stage actors
American male television actors
20th-century American male actors
People from Wilmette, Illinois
New Trier High School alumni
AIDS-related deaths in New York (state)
University of Michigan alumni
American gay actors
LGBT people from Illinois
Northwestern University School of Communication alumni
20th-century American LGBT people